The list of shipwrecks in May 1823 includes all ships sunk, foundered, grounded, or otherwise lost during May 1823.

2 May

3 May

4 May

5 May

6 May

7 May

8 May

9 May

10 May

11 May

13 May

14 May

16 May

17 May

18 May

20 May

22 May

26 May

27 May

30 May

Unknown date

References

1823-05